Kusavankuzhi is a village located in Kanyakumari district in Tamil Nadu, India.

Facilities
The village is home to the Mutharamman temple and a youth club for people of all religions. There is a Young Stars Cricket Team and the Vivekananda youth club.
Kusavankuzhi village famous in mutharamman temple. 

Villages in Kanyakumari district